Agung Prasetyo (born 22 December 1992) is an Indonesian professional footballer who plays as a centre-back for Liga 1 club Borneo Samarinda.

Club career

PSMS Medan
He was signed for PSMS Medan to play in Liga 2 in the 2020 season. This season was suspended on 27 March 2020 due to the COVID-19 pandemic. The season was abandoned and was declared void on 20 January 2021.

Persita Tangerang
In 2021, Agung Prasetyo signed a contract with Indonesian Liga 1 club Persita Tangerang. He made his debut on 28 August 2021 in a match against Persipura Jayapura at the Pakansari Stadium, Cibinong.

He scored his first goal for the club on 11 January 2022 in a 3–0 winning match against Persela Lamongan at Ngurah Rai Stadium. Persita's manager, Nyoman Suryanthara ensured that his team released Agung and 18 other players in preparation for Liga 1 next season, Persita's management respected Agung's decision and thanked him for joining Persita for one season. He contributed with 23 appearances and 1 goals during with the club.

Borneo
Agung was signed for Borneo to play in Liga 1 in the 2022–23 season. Agung received attention for the "kungfu kick" given to the head of Arema player Gian Zola during the 2022 Indonesia President's Cup and being unpunished, with the referee instead giving red card to Zola. On 24 July 2022, Agung made his league debut in a 3–0 win over Arema at Segiri Stadium. He scored his first goal for the club on 9 December in a 2–4 winning match against PSIS Semarang at Maguwoharjo Stadium. He scored his league goal for the club, scored from free header in a 3–2 lose over Persebaya Surabaya on 3 February at Gelora Joko Samudro Stadium.

International career 
Agung made his debut for the Indonesia U-23 on 6 June 2015 against Cambodia U-23 in the 2015 SEA Games.

References

External links 
 
 Agung Prasetyo at ligaindonesia.co.id

1992 births
Living people
People from Medan
Sportspeople from North Sumatra
Sportspeople from Medan
Indonesian footballers
Liga 1 (Indonesia) players
PSMS Medan players
PSM Makassar players
Semen Padang F.C. players
Persita Tangerang players
Borneo F.C. players
Indonesia youth international footballers
Association football defenders